Exportin-T is a protein that in humans is encoded by the XPOT gene.

This gene encodes a protein belonging to the RAN-GTPase exportin family that mediates export of tRNA from the nucleus to the cytoplasm. Translocation of tRNA to the cytoplasm occurs once exportin has bound both tRNA and GTP-bound RAN.

References

Further reading